The Orange Street Historic District encompasses a large residential in the East Rock section of New Haven, Connecticut.  Roughly bounded by Orange, Cottage, Eagle, State, and Audubon Streets, this area saw growth between about 1830 and 1900, and includes a broad diversity of well-preserved 19th-century residential structures.  It was listed on the U.S. National Register of Historic Places in 1985.  At that time, it included 546 buildings deemed to contribute to the historic character of the area.

New Haven's early economy was based mainly on trade based around its port.  In the 1820s, the Farmington Canal opened, spurring a round of industrial development that was accompanied by population growth.  The Orange Street area, located northeast of the New Haven Green, was one of the areas that saw significant development during this period.  Around 1850, the city became a railroad transportation hub, and its industrial base expanded significantly.  Residential growth in the Orange Street area expanded beyond Clark Street, into an area that was until 1850 farmland.

The district is an irregularly shaped area bounded on the northwest by Orange Street, between Audubon and Cottage Streets. The northwestern half of Orange Street is included in the Whitney Avenue Historic District, which abuts the Orange Street Historic District on the west. The southeastern boundary is State Street, although no buildings facing State Street are included.  Most of the buildings in the district are residential, and are of wood-frame construction.  They are stylistically diverse, with representative examples of styles from the late Federal period of the 1820s to the Colonial Revival of the early 20th century.

Gallery

See also
National Register of Historic Places listings in New Haven, Connecticut

References

External links

New Haven Preservation Trust: Orange Street Historic District

National Register of Historic Places in New Haven, Connecticut
Queen Anne architecture in Connecticut
Italianate architecture in Connecticut
Greek Revival architecture in Connecticut
Historic districts in New Haven, Connecticut
Historic districts on the National Register of Historic Places in Connecticut